Vatiga is a genus of lace bugs in the family Tingidae. There are about 11 described species in Vatiga.

Species
These 11 species belong to the genus Vatiga:
 Vatiga cassiae (Drake & Hambleton, 1934)
 Vatiga celebrata (Drake, 1928)
 Vatiga illudens (Drake, 1922) (cassava lace bug)
 Vatiga lonchocarpa (Drake & Hambleton, 1944)
 Vatiga longula (Drake, 1922)
 Vatiga manihotae (Drake, 1922)
 Vatiga pauxilla (Drake & Poor, 1939)
 Vatiga sesoris (Drake & Hambleton, 1942)
 Vatiga variana Drake & Hambleton, 1946
 Vatiga varianta (Drake, 1930)
 Vatiga viscosana Drake & Hambleton, 1946

References

Further reading

 
 
 
 
 

Tingidae
Articles created by Qbugbot